John Frey or Fray may refer to:

John P. Frey, early 20th-century American labor leader
Rev. Dr. John P. Frey, Leader, Theologian, Technologist, Sustainability and IT Efficiency thought leader
John H. Frey, Connecticut politician
John Fray, Lord Chief Baron of the Exchequer
John Fray (MP) for Hertfordshire (UK Parliament constituency)
John Andrew Frey (1929–1997), professor of Romance Languages at George Washington University